Melanostolus is a genus of flies in the family Dolichopodidae.

Species
Melanostolus kolomiezi Negrobov, 1984
Melanostolus longipilosus Negrobov, 1984
Melanostolus melancholicus (Loew, 1869)
Melanostolus negrobovi Olejníček & Barták, 1999
Melanostolus nigricilius (Loew, 1871)
Melanostolus tatjanae Negrobov, 1965

References

Diaphorinae
Dolichopodidae genera
Taxa named by Ferdinand Kowarz
Brachycera genera